Jorge Chediak (born 7 October 1951, in Montevideo) is a Uruguayan lawyer and judge.

Since 2009 he is a member of the Supreme Court of Justice.

References

1951 births
20th-century Uruguayan lawyers
21st-century Uruguayan judges
Uruguayan people of Lebanese descent
Supreme Court of Uruguay justices
Living people